The roller sports competition at the 2018 Central American and Caribbean Games was held in Barranquilla, Colombia from 21 July to 2 August. The artistic events were held at the Colegio San José and the speed events were held at the Patinódromo Villa Santos.

Medal summary

Artistic events

Speed events

Men's events

Women's events

Medal table

References

External links
Central American and Caribbean Games – Artistic
Central American and Caribbean Games – Speed

2018 Central American and Caribbean Games events
Central American and Caribbean Games
2018